Winthrop Hale "Ding" Palmer, Jr. (December 5, 1906 – February 4, 1970) was an American ice hockey player who competed in the 1932 Winter Olympics. He died in Warehouse Point, Connecticut.

Early life
Born in Summit, New Jersey, Palmer graduated from Kent School in Kent, Connecticut in 1926 where he played on the team with fellow hockey Olympian Johnny Bent. Both Palmer and Bent also played hockey at Yale University prior to competing in the Olympics.

In 1932 he was a member of the Olympic American ice hockey team, which won the silver medal. He played all six matches and scored eight goals. He was also a member of the Massachusetts Rangers, the American team that won the 1933 World Ice Hockey Championships.

He was inducted into the United States Hockey Hall of Fame in 1973.

External links
 United States Hockey Hall of Fame bio
 

1906 births
1970 deaths
Sportspeople from Summit, New Jersey
American men's ice hockey right wingers
Kent School alumni
Ice hockey players at the 1932 Winter Olympics
Olympic silver medalists for the United States in ice hockey
United States Hockey Hall of Fame inductees
Yale Bulldogs men's ice hockey players
Medalists at the 1932 Winter Olympics
Ice hockey players from New Jersey